Horace Raymond Huntley (23 April 1904 – 15 June 1990) was an English actor who appeared in dozens of British films from the 1930s to the 1970s. He also appeared in the ITV period drama Upstairs, Downstairs as the pragmatic family solicitor Sir Geoffrey Dillon, and other television shows, such as the Wodehouse Playhouse, ('Romance at Droitwich Spa'), in 1975..

Life and career

Early life
Huntley was born in Kings Norton, Worcestershire (now a suburb of Birmingham) in 1904.

Career

Stage
He made his stage debut at the Birmingham Repertory Theatre on 1 April 1922, in A Woman Killed with Kindness. His London debut followed at the Court Theatre on 22 February 1924, in As Far as Thought can Reach.

He subsequently inherited the role of Count Dracula from Edmund Blake in Hamilton Deane's touring adaptation of Dracula, which arrived at London's Little Theatre on 14 February 1927, subsequently transferring to the larger Duke of York's Theatre. Later that year he was offered the chance to reprise the role on Broadway (in a script streamlined by John L. Balderston); when he declined, the part was taken by Bela Lugosi instead. Huntley did, however, appear in a US touring production of the Deane/Balderston play, covering the east coast and midwest, from 1928 to 1930. "I have always considered the role of Count Dracula to have been an indiscretion of my youth," he recalled in 1989.

After Dracula he made his Broadway debut at the Vanderbilt Theatre on 23 February 1931, in The Venetian Glass Nephew. On returning to the UK, his many West End appearances included The Farmer's Wife (Queen's Theatre 1932), Cornelius (Duchess Theatre 1935), Bees on the Boat Deck (Lyric Theatre 1936) Time and the Conways (Duchess Theatre 1937), When We Are Married (St Martin's Theatre 1940), Rebecca (Queen's Theatre 1940; Strand Theatre 1942), They Came to a City (Globe Theatre 1943), The Late Edwina Black (Ambassadors Theatre 1948), And This Was Odd (Criterion Theatre 1951), Double Image (Savoy Theatre 1956), Any Other Business (Westminster Theatre 1958), Caught Napping (Piccadilly Theatre 1959), Difference of Opinion (Garrick Theatre 1963), An Ideal Husband (Garrick Theatre 1966), Getting Married (Strand Theatre 1967), Soldiers (New Theatre 1968) and Separate Tables (Apollo Theatre 1977). He also starred opposite Flora Robson in the Broadway production of Black Chiffon (48th Street Theatre 1950).

Film & television
Often cast as a supercilious bureaucrat or other authority figure, Huntley was also a staple figure in British films, his many appearances including The Way Ahead, I See a Dark Stranger, Passport to Pimlico and The Dam Busters. In his later years he became well known on television as Sir Geoffrey Dillon, the family solicitor to the Bellamys in LWT's popular 1970s drama series Upstairs, Downstairs in addition to which he also appeared as Mr. Justice Downes in the Granada Television daytime series, Crown Court.

Death
Huntley died in Westminster Hospital, London in 1990. In his obituary the New York Times wrote, "During his long career the actor played judges, bank managers, churchmen, bureaucrats and other figures of authority. He could play them straight if necessary, but in comedy his natural dryness of delivery was exaggerated to the point where the character he was playing invited mockery as a pompous humbug."

Complete filmography

 What Happened Then? (1934) .... Minor role (uncredited)
 Can You Hear Me, Mother (1935) .... Dolan
 Whom the Gods Love (1936) .... Langer
 Rembrandt (1937) .... Ludwick
 London Melody (1937) .... Policeman Outside Nightclub (uncredited)
 Knight Without Armour (1937) .... White Officer
 Dinner at the Ritz (1937) .... Gibout
 When We Are Married (1938, TV Movie) .... Councillor Albert Parker
 Let's Be Famous (1939) .... Singer in trio (uncredited)
 The Lion Has Wings (1939) .... Minor role (uncredited)
 Night Train to Munich (1940) .... Kampenfeldt
 Bulldog Sees It Through (1940) .... Tramp Steamer Officer
 Freedom Radio (1941) .... Rabenau
 The Ghost of St. Michael's (1941) .... Mr Humphries
 The Ghost Train (1941) .... John Price
 Inspector Hornleigh Goes To It (1941) .... Dr Kerbishley
 "Pimpernel" Smith (1941) .... Marx
 Once a Crook (1941) .... Prison Governor
 The Day Will Dawn (1942) .... Norwegian Under-Secretary (scenes deleted)
 The New Lot (1943, Short) .... Barrington (uncredited)
 When We Are Married (1943) .... Albert Parker
 The Way Ahead (1944) .... Pte Herbert Davenport
 They Came to a City (1944) .... Malcolm Stritton
 I See a Dark Stranger (1946) .... J. Miller
 School for Secrets (1946) .... Prof Laxton-Jones
 So Evil My Love (1948) .... Henry Courtney
 Men of Darkness (1948, TV Movie) .... Pisancon
 Broken Journey (1948) .... Edward Marshall
 Mr. Perrin and Mr. Traill (1948) .... Moy-Thompson
 It's Hard to Be Good (1948) .... Williams
 Passport to Pimlico (1949) .... Mr Wix
 The Late Edwina Black (1949, TV Movie) .... Henry Martin
 Trio (1950) .... Mr Henry Chester (segment "Sanatorium")
 The Long Dark Hall (1951) .... Chief Insp Sullivan
 I'll Never Forget You (1951) .... Mr Throstle
 Mr. Denning Drives North (1951) .... Wright
 When We Are Married (1951, TV movie) .... Councillor Albert Parker
 The Last Page (1952) .... Clive Oliver
 Laxdale Hall (1953) .... Samuel Pettigrew, MP
 Glad Tidings (1953) .... Tom Forester
 Meet Mr. Lucifer (1953) .... Patterson
 Hobson's Choice (1954) .... Nathaniel Beenstock
 Orders Are Orders (1954) .... Colonel Bellamy
 The Teckman Mystery (1954) .... Maurice Miller
 Aunt Clara (1954) .... Rev Maurice Hilton
 The Unguarded Hour (1955, TV Movie) .... Colonel William Mason
 The Prisoner (1955) .... The General
 The Constant Husband (1955) .... The Boss
 The Dam Busters (1955) .... Official, National Physical Laboratory
 Doctor at Sea (1955) .... Capt Beamish
 Geordie (1955) .... Olympic Selector
 The Last Man to Hang (1956) .... Attorney-General
 The Green Man (1956) .... Sir Gregory Upshott
 Town on Trial (1957) .... Dr Reese
 Brothers in Law (1957) .... Tatlock QC
 Jessica (1957, TV Movie) .... Stanley Baines
 Dial 999 (TV series) (1958)....Myners
 Next to No Time (1958) .... Forbes, Factory Supervisor
 Room at the Top (1959) .... Mr Hoylake
 Carlton-Browne of the F.O. (1959) .... Foreign Secretary Tufton Slade
 Innocent Meeting (1959) .... Harold
 The Mummy (1959) .... Joseph Whemple
 I'm All Right Jack (1959) .... Magistrate
 Our Man in Havana (1959) .... General
 Bottoms Up (1960) .... Garrick-Jones
 Breathless (1960) .... A Journalist (uncredited)
 Follow That Horse! (1960) .... Special Branch Chief
 Make Mine Mink (1960) .... Inspector Pape
 A French Mistress (1960) .... Rev Edwin Peake
 Sands of the Desert (1960) .... Bossom
 Suspect (1960) .... Sir George Gatting, Minister of Defence
 The Pure Hell of St Trinian's (1960) .... Judge
 Line of Enquiry (1961, TV Movie) .... Mr Sinclair
 Only Two Can Play (1962) .... Vernon
 Crooks Anonymous (1962) .... Wagstaffe
 Waltz of the Toreadors (1962) .... Ackroyd, Court President
 On the Beat (1962) .... Sir Ronald Ackroyd
 Nurse on Wheels (1963) .... Vicar
 The Yellow Teddy Bears (1963) .... Harry Halburton
 Father Came Too! (1964) .... Mr Wedgewood
 The Black Torment (1964) .... Colonel John Wentworth
 Rotten to the Core (1965) .... Prison Governor (uncredited)
 The Great St Trinian's Train Robbery (1966) .... Sir Horace, the Minister
 Hot Millions (1968) .... Bayswater (uncredited)
 Hostile Witness (1968) .... John Naylor
 The Adding Machine (1969) .... Smithers
 Arthur! Arthur! (1969) .... George Payne
 Destiny of a Spy (1969, TV Movie) .... Supt Pode
 Young Winston (1972) .... Old Officer (scenes deleted)
 That's Your Funeral (1972) .... Emmanuel Holroyd
 Symptoms (1974) .... Burke
 A Voyage Round My Father (1982, TV Movie) .... Judge
 Sleepwalker (1984) .... Old Englishman (final film role)

References

External links

1904 births
1990 deaths
English male film actors
English male stage actors
English male television actors
Male actors from Birmingham, West Midlands
20th-century English male actors